Donnie Lewis Jr. (born July 21, 1996) is an American football cornerback for the Birmingham Stallions of the United States Football League (USFL). He played college football at Tulane.

Professional career

Cleveland Browns
Lewis was drafted by the Cleveland Browns with the 221st overall pick in the seventh round of the 2019 NFL Draft. He signed his rookie contract with the Browns on May 2, 2019. The Browns waived Lewis on August 31, 2019. The Browns re-signed Lewis to their practice squad on September 7, 2019. Lewis was released by the Browns on September 12, 2019. The Browns re-signed Lewis to their practice squad a second time on September 20, 2019.

The Browns signed Lewis to their reserve/futures list on December 30, 2019. Lewis was waived by the Browns on September 3, 2020.

Cincinnati Bengals
On November 18, 2020, Lewis was signed to the Cincinnati Bengals practice squad. He signed a reserve/future contract on January 4, 2021. He was waived/injured on August 23, 2021 and placed on injured reserve. He was released on September 14.

Denver Broncos
On April 27, 2022, Lewis was signed by the Denver Broncos. He was waived/injured on August 29 and placed on injured reserve. He was released from injured reserve on September 1.

Birmingham Stallions
Lewis signed with the Birmingham Stallions of the USFL on January 14, 2023.

References

External links
Cleveland Browns bio
Tulane Green Wave bio

1996 births
Living people
Players of American football from Baton Rouge, Louisiana
American football cornerbacks
Tulane Green Wave football players
Cleveland Browns players
Cincinnati Bengals players
Central High School (Central, Louisiana) alumni
Denver Broncos players
Birmingham Stallions (2022) players